Akeem Oluwashegun Omolade (4 March 1983 – 13 June 2022) was a Nigerian professional footballer.

Career
Omolade arrived in Italy at the age of 17, joining Treviso, with whom he made his professional debut in the Serie B league. He subsequently joined Torino, with whom he made his Serie A debut.

Following his departure from Torino, he went on to play a career in the lower leagues of Italian football.

In 2011, he moved to Sicily to join Mazara. In 2012, he played for Ribera 1954 in Serie D, before returning to Mazara in 2013.

In 2014, he went down even further, joining Marsala-based Promozione club Borgata Terrenove.

Omolade died on 13 June 2022, at the age of 39.

References

External links

 
 

1983 births
2022 deaths
Sportspeople from Kaduna
Yoruba sportspeople
Association football forwards
Nigerian footballers
Serie A players
Serie B players
Treviso F.B.C. 1993 players
Torino F.C. players
Novara F.C. players
A.S.D. La Biellese players
A.C. Reggiana 1919 players
U.S. Vibonese Calcio players
Nigerian expatriate footballers
Nigerian expatriate sportspeople in Italy
Expatriate footballers in Italy